Close II You was a Dutch girl group founded in 1996. It was then disbanded in 2001 and reformed from 2011 to 2013.

History
The group was created through 1996 auditions, by the producers Eeg van Kruysdijk and Ed van Otterdijk. In August of that year, Natascha Scheffers, Sascha Koninkx, Nadja Nooijen, Arlice Beeldsnijder, and Marsha van de Berg were brought together as the original line-up and had their first hit with single "Nice & Nasty". After their first single, Arlice left the group and was replaced by Sally Flissinger (of Hermes House Band).

The girls had their biggest hit at the end of 1997 with the single "Baby Don’t Go". The success of the group took its toll and Koninkx left the group at the end of 1998, officially "because of health related issues". The group continued with the remaining four. Although only moderately successful afterwards, they continued to perform.

In May 2000, van de Berg left the group, after which Koninkx was asked to return. But only four months after the switch, Flissinger decided to leave. No replacement was found for her, and in 2001, Close II You was disbanded. Scheffers, Koninkx and Nooijen continued under the name Girls Together Outrageously (GTO). They released their only single, "I’ll be Around", which had no success. In October 2003 the girls finally disbanded.

Members

Discography

Studio albums

Singles

References

Dutch girl groups
Musical groups established in 1996